Perzinfotel (EAA-090) is a drug which acts as a potent NMDA antagonist. It has neuroprotective effects and has been investigated for the treatment of stroke, but lacks analgesic effects. Nevertheless, it shows a good safety profile compared to older drugs, although further development of this drug has been discontinued.

Prodrugs were developed since the oral bioavailability of perzinfotel is only around 3-5%.

References 

NMDA receptor antagonists
Phosphonic acids
Quinones
Cyclobutenes
Nitrogen heterocycles
Heterocyclic compounds with 2 rings
Enones